Nađa Đurđevac (born 25 August 2002) is a Montenegrin footballer who plays as a forward for Women's League club ŽFK Budućnost Podgorica and the Montenegro women's national team.

Club career
Đurđevac has played for Budućnost Podgorica in Montenegro.

International career
Đurđevac made her senior debut for Montenegro on 21 February 2021 as a 76th-minute substitution in a 5–0 friendly home win over North Macedonia.

References

External links

2002 births
Living people
Montenegrin women's footballers
Women's association football forwards
ŽFK Budućnost Podgorica players
Montenegro women's international footballers